Roland Doré,  (born 1938) spent his career at the École Polytechnique de Montréal as professor, director general and as chairman of the board of directors. He is a former president of the Canadian Space Agency from 1992 to 1994 then President of the  International Space University in Strasbourg, France from 1994 to 1998. In 2001, Doré received the Officer of the Order of Canada, Knight of the National Order of Quebec in 2010 and honorary doctorates from Concordia University and McGill University, Royal Military College Saint-Jean and Royal Military College of Canada.

He holds a bachelor's degree (1960) from the École Polytechnique de Montréal, a master's degree (1965) and a doctorate in mechanical engineering (1969) from Stanford University.

References 

1938 births
Living people
Knights of the National Order of Quebec
Officers of the Order of Canada
Presidents of the Canadian Space Agency
Academics from Montreal
Royal Military College of Canada
Stanford University alumni